Eartha Moore, mononymously known as Eartha, is an American female eclectic and alternative soul singer, songwriter and musician. 

Eartha debuted her first release This I Know in 2000. As a result of positive feedback on the track Love Jones which featured on the release, she released the maxi-single Love Jones in 2001, which consists of five mixes. She then followed up with her sophomore project Sidebars in 2002, for which she received two Grammy Award nominations and a win.  She continued to write and contribute with musicians and producers, at times as a ghostwriter. On September 21, 2010, Eartha released her third CD album, Ink Dry Blue.

Early and personal life 
Eartha was born in Los Angeles, California.

Eartha's biological parents, Philip L. and Zinna Moore, gave her and her older sister to a foster home when Zinna was stricken postpartum with a debilitating illness. At six months of age, Eartha was immediately placed in the home of foster parents Lucy and Otis Rushing. According to Contemporary Musicians, both Eartha's birth and foster fathers worked for the same company as machinists, unbeknownst to either. When Philip visited his daughters at the Rushing foster home for the very first time, he realized that Otis was his co-worker and foster father to his daughters. Eartha maintains that although she was raised in a good home with a strong Christian upbringing, being raised in a foster home added to her isolation because "no matter how good things are, you still long to be with your [birth] family."

Eartha's birth mother Zinna died in 1995, followed by her foster mother Lucy in 1998. Many of the tracks from the record Sidebars are a result of her losses.

Eartha began her musical endeavors as a child. She started singing at the age of 5, and at the age of 6 she began playing the drums and piano. She often followed her biological mother, who was a guitarist and the church organist, to rehearsals. Eartha frequently jumped on the drums to accompany her mother's playing. During such time, she received guidance and was inspired to pick up other instruments. During her visits to her grandmother's house, Eartha practiced the piano. When she entered junior high school, and as a member of the Greater Bethany Apostolic Church in Los Angeles, under the leadership of Pastor Bishop R.W. McMurray, later succeeded by Bishop Noel Jones, she began leading praise and worship, playing the saxophone and trumpet, while continuing to strengthen her percussion skills. In college, she learned to play the guitar and soon afterwards formed and directed the Voices of Vision church youth choir. Early on, she embraced classical, rock, hip hop, and alternative genres. Although Eartha's musical exposure had been mostly gospel music, her artistry was leaning towards a very eclectic and diverse style that would eventually define her own. Eartha attended high school in North Hills, CA. After graduation, she attended Los Angeles El Camino College and then Los Angeles Trade Technical College. Among her favorite authors are poet Ranier Maria Rilke, novelist Leo Tolstoy, and the Harlem Renaissance novelist/folklorist Zora Neal Hurston. Eartha is an avid reader and maintains that one is never done with learning and education.

Music career 

This I Know

In 2000, Eartha debuted her first album, This I Know, which received critical and popular acclaim. The album features Eartha playing all of the instruments, and it covers a wide range of styles, from gospel to R&B and hip-hop. AMG's Jonathan Widran noted, "If this impressive recording is any indication, Eartha Moore stands poised to become a powerful presence...." With the support of DJs and college radio stations, the Love Jones track began a groundswell in niche circles.

Love Jones

In 2001, upon release of the single, Love Jones landed on the Billboard Hot Dance Breakouts Maxi Singles chart at #2 position, the Urban Inspired Radio Waves at #24, Behind the Scenes WJKS at #1, and WNNN at #10. Shortly thereafter, other stations began adding and spinning the single. These were milestones of achievement, especially for an independent project with very limited distribution outlets. In efforts to counter the shortcomings that often challenge indies, she supported the label's aggressive campaign to get the music heard at as many outlets as would welcome independent artists. Thus, she performed at venues, including but not limited to, the BRE Conference in Atlanta, GA, Billboard Monitor Airplay in New York City, Unifest in Washington DC, Annual Unity Festival, Family Day in the Park in Columbus, GA, and Urban Network Power Jam in Palm Springs, sharing the stage with artists from Tommy Boy, EMI, Sony, Universal, and other labels. She also performed at other radio station sponsored concerts/festivals, clubs, school, churches, and private events across the country.  She appeared at the NoHo LA 3rd Anniversary Party and Awards Celebration, which featured art exhibitions by Grammy Award winner Allee Willis, known for mega hits such as Boogie Wonderland, I'll Be There for You, September, Neutron Dance, and Beverly Hills Cop soundtrack. Eartha performed for the TV tapings Fountain of Youth and Gospel Superfest 2000, both of which aired in over 40 markets in 2000 and 2001 respectively. She performed live for the ABC's Louisville, KY early morning newscast. Other appearances included Lady of Soul Awards, the RockWalk induction of Melissa Etheridge and Run DMC among others. The release received considerable attention from record pools, noncommercial, and college radio. The label launched a national movie theater advertising campaign to showcase Eartha in over 15,000 theatre screens and 5,000,000 in-theatre spins of track "Never Change." The track played in theatres before and after feature films. A national postering campaign at college campuses in New York, Atlanta, LA, Chicago, Detroit, Miami, San Francisco, Houston, Philadelphia, and Washington DC was also launched to support the release. Concurrently, the album was capturing the attention of music editors and receiving great coverage. The consensus was that Eartha was indeed a truly gifted and innovative talent whose creative abilities offered great innovation and a promising future. Urban Network's Music Editor Scott Galloway affirmed, "Eartha testifies with a heartfelt flava." Billboard Magazine noted, "Interest appears to be building for This I Know, the debut release from this contemporary Christian/gospel artist Eartha…the girl can really sing." Many artists have begun infusing all types of sounds into their music, making it diverse and often unpredictable. Eartha is leading the way.  "In the arena of innovative, new sound there is always one step further you can go…and Eartha Moore has taken that step and has kept right on moving," said Christian Moore (no relation to Eartha) from Dysonna Magazine.  This I Know was noted among the best in recorded music.

Sidebars

In 2002, Eartha 's second album, Sidebars, seemed initially not to do as well upon release. However, like This I Know, it sold briskly in nontraditional outlets. The album made some coast-to-coast club noise via lead single I'm Still Standing, mixed by hip-hop producer Chris Puram, who has worked with Janet Jackson, Jermaine Dupri, Missy Elliott, and Guns N' Roses "Eartha's inaugural opus will be in for quite a pleasant surprise. Sidebars is solid if not spectacular, as you're treated to an eclectic mix of retro-soul music." Although it received little airplay and moved slowly in traditional music outlets, registering only 52 scans according to Sound Scan, AFRT MUSIC reported selling 10,000 copies just two months after its September 2002 release. The feedback in underground circles was positive. While this is a relatively insignificant sales figure for a major artist, it is a very good showing for an indie outfit. The label sold the album at Eartha 's concerts, parties, clubs, and special events. Again, she worked an aggressive grassroots marketing campaign with her label to promote her music on an independent level. She appeared at the RockWalk induction of the Isley Brothers.  She worked with DJs, college radio stations, movie theatres, clubs, restaurants, and other nonconventional music outlets across the country, this time launching a 100,000 postering campaign at over 50 colleges, 50,000 CD giveaways, T-shirts, caps, and other promotional items. The hard work paid off in a big way. Eartha earned a Grammy nomination for Best Female R&B Vocal Performance for the song I'm Still Standing, sharing the field with Mary J. Blige, Ashanti, Aaliyah, and Jill Scott. However, it was her nomination for the Sidebars album for which Eartha won the Grammy Award in the Best Contemporary Soul Gospel Album category.

A double nomination in two very distinct categories such as R&B and Gospel points to her broad and unique approach to music. She is able to combine biblically based lyrics with infectious dance tracks such that the appeal is quite diverse. Eartha credits her label with fostering this unique approach, something that may not have been possible at a larger and more traditional label. She notes that her label affords her the opportunity to produce her own work without artistic restrictions.  Joseph Breuer, who engineered John Carpenter's Vampires Movie Score and Soundtrack, IMX's Introducing IMX, Keith Washington's KW, Rhasaan Patterson's Love in Stereo, and B.B. King's Deuces Wild, said, "The thing I like about Eartha is that she doesn't have to make it sound good through production because she does sound good."Ink Dry Blue

In 2010, Eartha released her third album, Ink Dry Blue.

Ghostwriting and literary contributions 
Eartha contributed an advice column "Ask Eartha" to Fresh Magazine, which was geared towards issues that are important to teens and young adults. Teens typically wrote about things in pop culture such as music, films, artists, and media images that they found influential. Eartha has also provided ghostwriting services to several music and literary projects. Given her affinity for writing, she enjoys sharing her writing via her blogs Eartha's Window at Blogger and Eartha's Blog Spot at MySpace.

TV

Philanthropy 
Eartha has appeared or performed for the Los Angeles Mission for the benefit of homeless mothers and children, Prison Ministries, Faithwalk Benefit Concert, Justice for Murdered Children Benefit Concert, Churches, Stay in School youth events, 102.7 KISS FM School Tours, Celebration of Champion Benefit for Baseball Hall of Famer Ernie Banks, and UCLA Charity Tennis Event.

Controversy 
Eartha stunned the music world when she received two Grammy nominations for her Sidebars album. Many wondered how a relatively unknown artist was able to garner the double Grammy nods, especially for I'm Still Standing in the R&B Best Female Vocal Performance category against a superstar lineup consisting of Mary J. Blige, Ashanti, Jill Scott, and Aaliyah. To that, Eartha said, "I couldn't even fathom being in this category with such divas." It is customary for very popular artists to be nominated to this category. However, the Recording Academy criteria are based on the quality and innovation of the recorded music released and submitted for judging; the criteria are not based on artist popularity, radio play, media coverage, or music sales. "The Grammy selection process was set up so an artist in her situation would have a chance," said Ron Roecker, Director of Communications for the National Academy of Recording Arts & Sciences. 

Eartha went on to win in the Best Contemporary Gospel Album for Sidebars at the 45th Annual Grammy Awards hosted in New York City on February 23, 2003.

Discography 
 2000: This I Know
 2001: Love Jones Maxi Single
 2002: Sidebars
 2009: Oh Holy Night Single
 2010: Ink Dry Blue

Videography 
 2002 I'm Still Standing

Charting

Awards and recognition

References

External links 
 
 http://www.afrtmusic.com/ AFRT Music

Living people
21st-century American keyboardists
21st-century American singers
21st-century American women singers
American contemporary R&B singers
American women drummers
American women rock singers
American women guitarists
American women pianists
Grammy Award winners
Guitarists from Los Angeles
Singers from California
Songwriters from California
Year of birth missing (living people)